The 1969 Tour of the Basque Country was the ninth edition of the Tour of the Basque Country cycle race and was held from 16 April to 20 April 1969. The race started and finished in Eibar. The race was won by Jacques Anquetil of the Bic team.

General classification

References

1969
Bas